Koh-Lanta: Raja Ampat is the 11th season of Koh-lanta, the French version of Survivor. This season takes place in Indonesia on the archipelago of Raja Ampat Islands, and began broadcasting on TF1 on 9 September 2011, every Friday at 8:45pm (7:45 p.m. UTC) before Secret Story 2011.

Two new rules were introduced in this season. One is taken directly from the American Survivor format: the hidden immunity idol (represented as a necklace). There is also a new rule called the black vote, which allows an eliminated contestant to take revenge by voting once more against one of the remaining contestants. The finale was broadcast 16 December 2011 when, after 41 days, Gérard Urdampilleta won in a 7-2 jury vote against Teheiura Teahui to be given the title of Sole Survivor.

Finishing order

Future appearances
Patricia Morel and Teheiura Teahui returned for Koh-Lanta: La Revanche des Héros. Teahui later returned again for Koh-Lanta: La Nouvelle Édition alongside Florence Delbarre Reuter, Martin Bazin and Laurent Maistret which Maistret won against Bazin. Olivier Moenaert returned for Koh-Lanta: Le Combat des Héros. Teahui later returned for a fourth time for Koh-Lanta: L'Île des héros. Maistret and Teahui returned again for Koh-Lanta: La Légende.

Challenges

Elimination table

References

External links
 

2011 French television seasons
11
Television shows filmed in Indonesia